Eburia cacapyra is a species of beetle in the family Cerambycidae found in Ecuador.

References

cacapyra
Beetles described in 1999
Endemic fauna of Ecuador